Reinaldo Berto Gorno (July 18, 1918 in Yapeyú – April 10, 1994 in Buenos Aires) was a long-distance runner from Argentina, who, behind Emil Zátopek, won the silver medal at the 1952 Summer Olympics, held in Helsinki, Finland. In 1954 he became the first non-Japanese winner of the Fukuoka Marathon. He also won the silver medal at the 1951 Pan American Games. His personal best marathon time was 2:20:28 (1955).

External links
 Biography 
 
 

1918 births
1994 deaths
Argentine male marathon runners
Athletes (track and field) at the 1951 Pan American Games
Athletes (track and field) at the 1952 Summer Olympics
Olympic athletes of Argentina
Olympic silver medalists for Argentina
People from Yapeyú
Pan American Games medalists in athletics (track and field)
Medalists at the 1952 Summer Olympics
Pan American Games silver medalists for Argentina
Olympic silver medalists in athletics (track and field)
Medalists at the 1951 Pan American Games
Sportspeople from Corrientes Province